Saint George was a soldier in the Roman army in the 3rd and 4th centuries AD, venerated as a Christian martyr.

Saint George or Saint George's may also refer to:

Film and television
 Saint George (film), a 2016 Portuguese film
 Saint George (TV series), an American television comedy

Honors
 Cross of St. George, a military honor in Russia
 Order of St. George, a military honor in Russia
 Ribbon of Saint George, a Russian patriotic ribbon
 Sacred Military Constantinian Order of Saint George, a Roman Catholic order of chivalry

Monasteries
 Saint George Monastery, al-Khader, a Greek Orthodox monastery in al-Khader, West Bank
 St. George's Monastery, Wadi Qelt, an ancient monastery in Waldi Qilt, in the West Bank

People
 St George of Choziba, seventh-century saint
 St George I of Antioch, Syriac Orthodox Patriarch of Antioch (died 790)
 St George the Confessor, Bishop of Antioch in Pisidia (died 814)
 St George, Archbishop of Develtos, one of the Martyrs of Adrianople (died 815)
 St George the Standard-Bearer, Archbishop of Mytilene (776–821)
 St George of Amastris, Bishop of Amastris (died 825)
 St George of Mytilene (or Militene), also called George the Younger; Archbishop of Mytilene (753–846), brother of St Symeon Stylites of Lesbos
 St George, one of the Martyrs of Córdoba (died 852)
 St George the Hagiorite (1009–1065)
 St George of Kratovo (died 1515)
 St George Preca (1880–1962), Maltese Roman Catholic priest
 St George (Karslidis) of Drama (1901–1959)

Places

Antigua and Barbuda 

 Saint George Parish, Antigua and Barbuda

Australia
 Parish of St George, a parish in Sydney.
 St George (Sydney), a region of Sydney
 St George, Queensland
 St Georges, South Australia, Adelaide
 Division of St George, proclaimed 1949, abolished 1993, electoral district in New South Wales, Australia
 Electoral district of St George, created 1894, abolished 1930, electoral district in New South Wales, Australia

Barbados
 Saint George, Barbados, a parish in Barbados.

Bermuda
 St. George's, Bermuda, an UNESCO World Heritage Site
 St. George's Parish, Bermuda, one of Bermuda's parishes, containing the above town
 St. George's Island, Bermuda, an island of the archipelago of Bermuda, contained within the above parish

Canada
 St. George (Manitoba provincial electoral district), established 1914, eliminated 1981
 St. George, New Brunswick, a town in Charlotte County
 Saint George Parish, New Brunswick
 St. George's, Newfoundland and Labrador
 St. George's Bay (Newfoundland and Labrador), a bay in Newfoundland and Labrador
 St. George's Bay (Nova Scotia), a bay in Nova Scotia
 St. George, Ontario, a village near Brantford
 St. George (TTC), a subway station in Toronto, Ontario
 St. George (Ontario provincial electoral district), created 1926, abolished 1987
 Saint-Georges, Quebec, a city in the Chaudière-Appalaches region of Quebec

Grenada
 St. George's, Grenada, the capital city
 Saint George Parish, Grenada

Greenland
 Saint George Fjord

Romania

 Sfântu Gheorghe, a Székely city north of Braşov
Sfântu Gheorghe, Tulcea, a commune in Tulcea County
Sfântu Gheorghe, Ialomița, a commune in Ialomița County

United Kingdom
 St George, Bristol
 St. George, Conwy
 St George Hanover Square, London
 St George in the East, London
 St George in the East (parish), London
St George, former name of Easton in Gordano, North Somerset
 St. Georges, North Somerset, near Weston-super-Mare
 St George's, Preston, an electoral ward in Preston, Lancashire
 St. Georges, Telford
 St George's Channel, connecting the Irish Sea and the Atlantic Ocean
 Saint George's Hill, Weybridge
 St George (UK Parliament constituency)

United States
 St. George, Alaska
 St. George's Hundred, Delaware, an unincorporated subdivision of New Castle County
 St. George, Broward County, Florida, a former census-designated place, now a neighborhood of Lauderhill
 St. George, Pinellas County, Florida, a place in Pinellas County, Florida
 St. George Island (Florida) in Franklin County
 Saint George, Georgia
 Saint George, Illinois
 St. George, Kansas
 St. George, Louisiana
 St. George, Maine
 St. George, Minnesota
 St. George Township, Benton County, Minnesota
 St. George, Missouri
 St. George, Wright County, Missouri
 St. George, Staten Island, New York
 St. George, South Carolina
 St. George, Utah
 St. George, Vermont, a New England town
 St. George (CDP), Vermont, census-designated place within the town
 Saint George, Virginia 
 St. George, West Virginia

Other places
 St Georges Strand, a coastal village near Port Elizabeth, South Africa 
 Saint George Parish, Antigua and Barbuda
 Saint George, Barbados
 Saint George's Memorial Church, Ypres, Belgium
 Saint George Parish, Dominica
 St. Georg, Hamburg, a quarter of Hamburg, Germany
 Saint George Bay, Beirut, Lebanon
 Saint George's Channel (Papua New Guinea)
 St. George's Caye, an island in the Caribbean Sea
 Saint George Basseterre Parish, Saint Kitts and Nevis
 Saint George Parish, Saint Vincent and the Grenadines
 Saint-George, Switzerland
 São Jorge do Ivaí, a municipality in the state of Paraná, Brazil

Schools
 St. George Campus, University of Toronto, Canada
 St George's, University of London, a medical college
 St. George's Girls' School (Penang, Malaysia)
 St. George's University, Grenada

Sports
 Birmingham St George's F.C., a defunct English association football club
 Saint George S.C., an Ethiopian association football club
 St George FC, an Australian association football club
 St Georges A.F.C., an association football club in Douglas, Isle of Man
 St. George Dragons, an Australian rugby league club
 St George AFC, an Australian Rules Football club based in Sydney, Australia
 St. George Illawarra Dragons, Australian Rugby League team in the NRL
 St. George's F.C., a Maltese association football club

Other uses
 St. George (name)
 St George (advertisement), a commercial for the UK soft drink Blackcurrant Tango
 Saint George (Donatello), a c. 1415–1417 sculpture by Donatello
 Saint George (icon, 1130), a Russian Saint George icon
 Saint George the Victorious (coin), Russian coin
 St. George Bank, an Australian bank
 St. George Defence, an uncommon chess opening
 St George's Distillery, a distillery in England
 St. George Records, a record label
 St. George Spirits, a distillery in California, USA
 Saint George's Day, the feast day of Saint George
 St. George's mushroom or Calocybe gambosa
 St George's Park National Football Centre

See also
 Agios Georgios (disambiguation)
 Battle of Cape St. George, a naval battle of the Pacific campaign of World War II
 Battle of St. George's Caye, a 1798 battle during Anglo-Spanish War
 Order of Saint George (disambiguation)
 Reial Acadèmia Catalana de Belles Arts de Sant Jordi, Spain
 Russian battleship Georgii Pobedonosets ("Saint George the victorious"), an 1892 Russian battleship involved in the Potemkin mutiny
 Georgii Pobedonosets, a Ropucha-class landing ship troop carrier in the Russian Navy
 Saint George and the Dragon
 St. George Island (disambiguation)
 Saint George Parish (disambiguation)
 St George's Castle (disambiguation)
 St. George's Cathedral (disambiguation)
 St George's Church (disambiguation)
 St. George's College (disambiguation)
 St George's Cross subway station, an underground station in Glasgow, Scotland
 St. George's Episcopal Church (disambiguation)
 St George's Hospital (disambiguation)
 St. George's School (disambiguation)
 Saint-Georges (disambiguation)
 San Giorgio (disambiguation)
 San Jorge (disambiguation)
 Sankt Georgen (disambiguation)
 São Jorge (disambiguation)
 Szentgyörgymező